Kalikamai (Nepali: कालिकामाई ) is a rural municipality in Parsa District in Province No. 2 of Nepal. It was formed in 2016 occupying current 5 sections (wards) from previous 5 former VDCs. It occupies an area of 24.33 km2 with a total population of 21,131.

References 

Municipalities in Madhesh Province
Rural municipalities of Nepal established in 2017
Rural municipalities in Madhesh Province